Tam Kong Pak (27 November 1911 – 16 March 2006) was a China-born Hong Kong-based former footballer who played as a forward for the Chinese national football team in 1934. He also represented his nation at the 1936 Summer Olympics in Berlin.

Personal life
Tam is the father of Hong Kong singer and actor Alan Tam.

Tam worked was a traffic officer during his season with Canton Police from 1930 to 1931. He was also involved in the transport of supplies on the famed Burma Road when he fled during World War II.

Career statistics

International

International goals
Scores and results list China's goal tally first.

References

1911 births
2006 deaths
Chinese footballers
China international footballers
Association football forwards
Footballers at the 1936 Summer Olympics
Olympic footballers of China